The Chinese National Federation of Industries (CNFI), established in 1942 (known as the Chinese National Association of Industries before 1948), is a nonprofit organization composed of about 150 member associations in  the manufacturing in the Republic of China (Taiwan). Each member association represents their respective field of manufacturing industry. More than 100,000 industrial companies in Taiwan are represented by their associations. The CNFI serves as a forum for views and opinions of the country’s industrial sector that has been aiming at upgrading and promoting the economic development of Taiwan.

See also
Taiwan External Trade Development Council
American Chamber of Commerce in Taipei

External links
http://www.cnfi.org.tw/
https://web.archive.org/web/20090803044610/http://www.industry.net.tw/
https://web.archive.org/web/20090603101238/http://www.patent.org.tw/

1942 establishments in China
Non-profit organizations based in Taiwan
Organizations established in 1942